Ceet Fouad [pronounced: “see-TEE”] (born 1971) is a French-Algerian graffiti artist.

Biography
Ceet Fouad was born in Algeria in 1971, of Moroccan descent, and moved to Toulouse, France, in 1978 at the age of seven years old. Since 2003, Fouad has been based in Shenzhen, north of Hong Kong.

In 2019 he completed a 40m tall mural on a building in Toulouse, France.

Exhibitions
He has been a regular artist-in-residence at the Montresso Foundation's art estate in Marrakech, the "Jardin Rouge",  since 2014.

1997 Lyon Biennale of Contemporary Art
1999 Museum of Modern Art in Vienna
2000 National Museum of Popular Arts and Traditions in Paris
2001 Museum of Castres 
2007 Shenzhen — Hong Kong Bi-City Biennale of Urbanism and Architecture 
2015 UrbanArt Biennale in Germany
2016 Pop-Up Show at the Pompidou Centre in Paris.
2017 Amanda Wei Gallery Hong Kong - Art Stage (Off The Wall) Jakarta - Affordable Art Fair Hong Kong - Jardin Orange gallery Shenzhen.
2018 Alain Daudet gallery Toulouse - Idroom Gallery Genève - Galerie Very Yes Saint-Pierre, Réunion.
2019 Biennale Urban Art Museum Völklingen - Art Fair Taipe Taiwan - Amanda Wei Gallery Hong Kong.

References

References
Graffiti Asia, Ryo Sanada, Suridh Hassan, Studio Rarekwai (London, England), Laurence King, 2010.
Truskool: une histoire du graffiti à Toulouse, Olivier Gal, Atlantica, 2016.
CeeT Fouad, I believe I can touch the sky, Amanda Wei Gallery Edition, Text by Annne Devailly, Artistes d'Occitanie, 2019.

External links

Graffiti artists
Living people
People from Shenzhen
Shenzhen
1971 births
21st-century Algerian people